The National Research Ethics Service (NRES) is a UK medical quango which deals with research ethics. Principal Investigators must describe the experiment they intend to pursue to the NRES for its approval, failing which the study is prohibited.

History
The NRES was launched on 1 April 2007.

The adjective "National" was omitted from the name at some unknown point in time.

Purpose
In 2009, the NRES issued a leaflet in which it described its purpose:
The National Research Ethics Service (NRES) reviews research proposals to protect the rights and safety of research participants and enables ethical research which is of potential benefit to science and society.

Substance of reports
The substance of the NRES reports can be gleaned from an approval obtained in 2011 by Stephanie Taylor, who was then Professor of Public Health and Primary Care at Queen Mary University of London.

References

2007 establishments in the United Kingdom
Government agencies established in 2007
British medical research
Department of Health and Social Care
Non-departmental public bodies of the United Kingdom government
Design of experiments
Human subject research
Clinical research ethics
Medical ethics
Drug safety
Social research
Ethics organizations
Ethics and statistics
Research ethics
Regulatory compliance